The 2009 Duel in the Pool was a swimming competition between a team from the United States and a combined British, German and Italian "E-Stars" team held on Friday 18 and Saturday 19 December 2009 at the Manchester Aquatics Centre, United Kingdom. The naming rights are held by Mutual of Omaha and British Gas in the United States and Europe respectively – the event was therefore promoted as the 2009 Mutual of Omaha Duel in the Pool and 2009 British Gas Duel in the Pool.

The duel was won by the United States with a final score of 185–78, with eight short course world records broken – all by the USA team.

Background
In March 2009 it was announced that British Swimming were looking at proposals to host a Duel in the Pool style meet between the US and a combined European team in Manchester, dubbed the Ryder Cup of swimming. On 21 October 2009, it was announced that a Duel in the Pool will take place between a "European select team" and the US in Manchester on 18 and 19 December 2009. This event will include the first competitive performance by Michael Phelps in Britain.

Teams

E-Stars

The E-Stars team was announced on 25 November following a delay in confirming availability of some of the originally selected swimmers. It was originally intended that the European team would include 12 swimmers from each of the three participating nations, however the team list included fourteen each from Great Britain and Italy, with just eight from Germany.

Middle-distance freestyle swimmers Joanne Jackson (GBR) and Federica Pellegrini (ITA) were originally included on the team list, however their withdrawals were announced on 4 December – Jackson due to recovering from a lung infection, and Pellegrini due to a clash with an awards dinner in Italy. Jackson's position in the team was filled by Jazmin Carlin (GBR). German Steffen Deibler was present on the original team list, however he withdrew from the event due to illness on 14 December and was replaced by Marco Orsi of Italy. Alessia Filippi (ITA) also withdrew due to illness on this date. Keri-Anne Payne (GBR) was drafted into the team as a replacement for Filippi just a few days prior to the start of the competition. The final team list consisted of 13 Italian, 7 German and 15 British members.

Men
Federico Colbertaldo (ITA)
David Davies (GBR)
Hendrik Feldwehr (GER)
Christian Galenda (ITA)
Edoardo Giorgetti (ITA)
James Goddard (GBR)
Thomas Haffield (GBR)
Marco Koch (GER)
Filippo Magnini (ITA)
Luca Marin (ITA)
Joseph Davide Natullo (ITA)
Marco Orsi (ITA)
Robbie Renwick (GBR)
Michael Rock (GBR)
Fabio Scozzoli (ITA)
Benjamin Starke (GER)
Liam Tancock (GBR)
Christopher Walker-Hebborn (GBR)

Women
Rebecca Adlington (GBR)
Ilaria Bianchi (ITA)
Chiara Boggiatto (ITA)
Jazmin Carlin (GBR)
Caterina Giacchetti (ITA)
Francesca Halsall (GBR)
Caitlin McClatchey (GBR)
Annika Mehlhorn (GER)
Hannah Miley (GBR)
Keri-Anne Payne (GBR)
Caroline Ruhnau (GER)
Daniela Samulski (GER)
Ilaria Scarcella (ITA)
Daniela Schreiber (GER)
Francesca Segat (ITA)
Elizabeth Simmonds (GBR)
Gemma Spofforth (GBR)

United States

USA Swimming announced their team list on 28 October. Ryan Lochte pulled out of the team on 11 December due to injury.

Men
Nathan Adrian
Mike Alexandrov
Jack Brown
Tyler Clary
Mark Gangloff
Matt Grevers
Michael Klueh
Chad LaTourette
Sean Mahoney
Tyler McGill
Aaron Peirsol
Michael Phelps
Kevin Swander
Nick Thoman
Alex Vanderkaay
Peter Vanderkaay
Garrett Weber-Gale

Women
Elizabeth Beisel
Missy Franklin
Katy Freeman
Jessica Hardy
Margaret Hoelzer
Katie Hoff
Dagny Knutson
Ariana Kukors
Christine Magnuson
Amber McDermott
Hayley McGregory
Mary Mohler
Elizabeth Pelton
Allison Schmitt
Julia Smit
Rebecca Soni
Dana Vollmer
Amanda Weir

Format
The competition followed the format of previous Duel in the Pool events, and were held in a short course (25 m) pool. Up to three swimmers from each team competed in each of the twenty-six individual events – thirteen each for men and women. Points were awarded to the top 3 finishers in each individual event – five points for the gold medal finisher, three for silver and one for bronze. Swimmers in fourth to sixth position were awarded no points. The winning team in each of the relay events were awarded seven points, with none for the losing team. In the event of a tie, a mixed 4×50 m medley relay would have been held with a single decisive point to the winner.

Gold medallists in each event received a prize of 1,000 US Dollars, with world record swims receiving a bonus of 15,000 US Dollars.

Events were swum in the following order, with women followed by men in each event.

Day 1 (18 December)
400 m medley relay
400 m individual medley
100 m freestyle
200 m backstroke
200 m breaststroke
100 m butterfly
400 m freestyle

Day 2 (19 December)
800 m freestyle
200 m freestyle
100 m backstroke
100 m breaststroke
200 m butterfly
50 m freestyle
200 m individual medley
400 m freestyle relay

Venue

Following Manchester's successful hosting of the 2008 FINA World Swimming Championships (25 m) at the Manchester Evening News Arena, the Manchester Aquatics Centre (which was the training and warm up venue for the 2008 championships) was chosen to host the 2009 Duel in the Pool. The venue was also that used for the aquatic sports at the 2002 Commonwealth Games.

The main pool was used for the 2009 Duel in the Pool – it was converted to the short course (25 m) format with temporary seating for 3000 positioned atop of the moveable floor sections of the diving pool and Oxford Road end of the main pool.

Results
The results for each event are shown below. World (WR), European (ER) and United States national (AM) records are indicated in the notes column as per the official results sheets, whilst British (BR), Italian (IR) and German (GR) national records are individually referenced where the time was not also a world or European record.

4×100 m medley relay

Women

Men

400 m individual medley

Women

Men

100 m freestyle

Women

Men

200 m backstroke

Women

Men

200 m breaststroke

Women

Men

100 m butterfly

Women

Men

400 m freestyle

Women

Men

After day 1 of the Duel, USA were leading the E-Stars 89–33.

800 m freestyle

Women

Men

200 m freestyle

Women

Men

100 m backstroke

Women

Men

100 m breaststroke

Women

Men

200 m butterfly

Women

Men

50 m freestyle

Women

Men

200 m individual medley

Women

Men

4×100 m freestyle relay

Women

Men

Final points tally

Legend: WR – World record; ER – World record; AM – United States record; BR – British record; GR – German record; IR – Italian record; DSQ – Disqualified

Broadcast
In the United Kingdom the event was broadcast live on the BBC's channels and via its website. Friday's session was on BBC Three, and Saturday's on BBC One.

NBC broadcast highlights of the event on 27 December in the United States.

See also
2009 in swimming

References

External links
2009 Duel in the Pool

Duel in the Pool
Duel in the Pool
2009